André Zonnequin (born 21 October 1896, date of death unknown) was a French racing cyclist. He rode in the 1922 Tour de France.

References

1896 births
Year of death missing
French male cyclists
Place of birth missing